Guilford Place is a Grade II listed Georgian terrace of four houses in  Guilford Place, London WC1, built in about 1791 to 1793 by J. Tomes and W. Harrison.

References

External links

Grade II listed buildings in the London Borough of Camden
Grade II listed houses in London
Houses completed in 1793
Georgian architecture in the London Borough of Camden